Adowal Gujrat  is a town and union council of Gujrat District in the Punjab province of Pakistan. It is located at 32°34'56"N 74°02'50"E  and lies outside the district capital, Gujrat. It is bordered by the GT road on one side and on the other touches Gujranwala by-pass. Addowal is one of the larger towns in Gujrat in terms of both population and area.

Name
The name is thought to be a combination of two Hindi names: Ahla and Oodal. In Hindu myth these were two brothers who were thrown into a fire by their father, the local king, and saved by God.

Economy
Agriculture principally was the source of income of the Addowal but increasingly more job opportunities are found outside the area with particularly a sizeable migration to Middle Eastern and Western countries, such as Greece, Italy and Spain, where more of the Addowal are to found than in the province. The migrant workers usually send back to family in the province money by which to survive. In 2009, the Mandi (Market) of Gujrat shifted to the outer belt of Addowal (bypass side) thus providing a new source of economic development and income.

Religion
Most people in Addowal are Muslims, and there are six mosques in the town. There is also a very small Christian minority.

Education

There are four private and two public primary schools.

Drinking water

Hand pumps were previously used for drawing drinking water but most people have now shifted to electric motor pumps. Traditionally, these pumps were fitted on the bore to a depth of 65 feet and the water quality was very high. However, good drinking water is no longer at that depth and people drill three hundred feet in order to get better quality water. The poor quality of drinking water has caused many illnesses.

Union council

Villages in the Union Council of Addowal include Dittewal, Marrarian Sharif, Sahnwal, Tibi Gorian Mughlan, Marlan, Shahabdewaal and Chechian.

Latest local bodies election was held on 30 October 2015. Choudry Rukhsar Melo, an independent candidate, won by overwhelming majority.

Marrarian Sharif 

It is Morrian and not Marrian. Mor-ra-ri was a famous Hindu god. Sahrif was added to its name as a respect to a Muslim scholar Naik Alam.

Tibi Gorian Mughlan 

Village Tibi Gorian Mughlan, 1 mile west of present-day Gujrat City traces back its history and name from Mughal, Amir Taimoor Gurgan, (Timor Gurgan/Tamerlane; 1336-1405 AD) whose armies camped here when he conquered India (1398-1399 AD).  Originally it was Tibi (small hill), Gurgan Mughlan and later Tibi Gorian Mughlan. There are many places and villages of the same name. Tibi Gorian Mughlan throughout India and Pakistan, where Taimoor Gurgan's armies camped or fought against Tughlaq King Nasir ud-Din Muhammad Shah Tughlaq and defeated him.

References

Union councils of Gujrat District
Populated places in Gujrat District
Towns in Gujrat District